Sartal-e Abdarreh (also Romanized as Sartal-e Ābdarreh; also known as Sartal and Sar Tūl) is a village in Tayebi-ye Sarhadi-ye Gharbi Rural District, Charusa District, Kohgiluyeh County, Kohgiluyeh and Boyer-Ahmad Province, Iran. At the 2006 census, its population was 50, in 10 families.

References 

Populated places in Kohgiluyeh County